is a fictional character in the anime and manga series Bleach created by Tite Kubo. He was the captain of the 3rd Division in the Gotei 13 until he betrays Soul Society, and after that becomes a commander in Sōsuke Aizen's arrancar army. Later on, his initial betrayal turns out to be a trick to get close to Aizen, and he attempts to kill him. His lieutenant was Izuru Kira.

Character outline

Gin's most prominent characteristic is his expression; with his slitted eyes and ever-present grin, his face looks like that of a fox. Ichigo Kurosaki derisively nicknames him "fox-face" in their first meeting because of this (in the English dub, he instead replies with a more generalized insult). He also has unusual silver hair, which has a purple tint to it in the anime; his name refers to his hair color, gin "silver". Gin rarely removes his smile or opens his eyes; his eyes open when he is significantly annoyed, angry or surprised. There are only a few times when he opens his eyes: once in a flashback when he and Aizen rescued Momo Hinamori, Izuru Kira, Renji Abarai, Shūhei Hisagi, and other students from hollows, during a battle with 10th Division Captain Tōshirō Hitsugaya, when he got slashed and then killed by Sōsuke Aizen and a further two more times during his fight with Ichigo after releasing his bankai. His eyes are alternately portrayed in the anime as blood red because his eye color was not yet known. In episode 270, during the special feature at the end, and in episode 300–301, during fight with Ichigo Kurosaki, his eyes are shown as an icy blue color, which is the same as the color he had on the manga. In contrast, there are far more moments when he stops smiling, those usually being lesser degrees of annoyance, genuinely apologetic moments, or in deep contemplation over a sudden epiphany.

Gin's constant happy façade tends to have the opposite effect on those he meets, making them instantly distrust him. His use of sarcasm only further encourages this, especially in those who have known him for a long time. Rukia comments on how she felt like snakes were wrapping around her neck whenever Gin spoke, despite the fact that he was speaking to her brother at the time. Kaname Tōsen notes that Gin has a similar effect on just about everyone when explaining Wonderweiss Margera's frightened reaction to Gin. In both manga and anime, Gin speaks with a distinct Kyoto dialect, which is indirect and polite. His English dubbed voice is also formal and polite, but with a rather mocking and facetious undertone. Another aspect is his habit of talking with Byakuya Kuchiki, which Rukia believes he did specifically to unsettle her since she was afraid of him.

After betraying Soul Society, Gin switches his captain's attire for a similar but unmarked garment. He now wears a long, white robe over his normal Soul Reaper hakama. The hilt of his zanpakutō visibly protrudes from under the robe through the opening down to his waist. Later, Ichimaru is seen wearing a white hakama like the arrancar, instead of the black one he first appears in. Gin wears his robe open in a narrow 'V' down to his waist, closed to below the hips, then open again to the hem, which falls about mid-calf. His robe has long bell sleeves where he hides his hands as is done with kimono sleeves. The lining of the robe and edges or layers of the under-robe(s) appear black. From other examples, it is likely he is also wearing black tabi with white waraji. His zanpakutō is not visible with this outfit. Furthermore, his outfit appears to be similar to Ichigo's while in Bankai.

History
Gin saved Rangiku Matsumoto from death at the hands of some of Sōsuke Aizen's minions when they were children, and the two have been good friends since then. Rangiku is the only person Gin seems to truly care about, although he seems to "disappear" often, as Rangiku puts it. Though it's later shown his constant departures were all a part of his patient plan to get revenge against Aizen for ever causing her harm. He also never tells her where he's going without leaving her anything for her to remember him by, something that Rangiku's hated. Though, she also says (after his death) if he'd left anything for her, she'd probably never to be able to move on and he must've known she cared for him too much to do so if he had left anything. Rangiku then says, she loves that about him.

Near the end of the Soul Society arc Gin, who allowed himself to be restrained by Rangiku but manages to get free before leaving with Aizen and Tosen, tells her "Well that's a bit of a let down, I was enjoying that (being in her grip); I wouldn't have minded being your captive a little bit longer. Goodbye, Rangiku, I'm sorry." implying underlying feelings, this is one of the few times Gin doesn't smile. All of the other times, being in Rangiku's presence, usually when feeling regret or sadness.

After saving Rangiku, Gin secretly swore revenge on Aizen. His unsettling appearance, apparent ruthlessness in battle, and apparent betrayal of the Soul Society were necessary to facilitate this. The first step in his revenge was joining one of the 13 Guardian Divisions. Gin was considered a child prodigy since he graduated from the academy within a year and was assigned to a seated position in the 5th Division. Killing the 3rd seat of the division with ease, Gin aroused Aizen's interest in him. He swore his loyalty to Aizen from the day they met, though only so he could discover Aizen's weakness and avenge Rangiku's near death when the time came. Eventually Gin became lieutenant of 5th Division under Captain Sōsuke Aizen. As captain he was in command of 3rd Division.

Synopsis
Gin's very first appearance is alongside Captain Kenpachi Zaraki when the two catch and converse with Captain Byakuya Kuchiki after the latter delivers Rukia Kuchiki's sentence. He then appears at the gates leading into the Seireitei on Aizen's orders, repelling both Ichigo Kurosaki and the gate keeper Jidanbō without killing them, simultaneously closing the gate which Jidanbō was holding open. The other captains question his failure to kill opponents whom he should have had no trouble killing, but a second intrusion by Ichigo's group, followed by the supposed death of Aizen, leaves them with bigger concerns. Aizen, having faked his death, has Gin deliberately cast suspicion on himself, thereby drawing attention away from Aizen's activities. After Aizen's plot is revealed and they retreat to Hueco Mundo, Gin bids Rangiku farewell while apologizing to her.

In Hueco Mundo, Gin jokingly chides Aizen over his habit of playing around with his subordinates. When Ichigo's group breaks into Las Noches, he observes them, even altering the position of the halls when no one is around. When Ulquiorra Cifer catches him in the act, Gin denies changing anything, saying that he wouldn't do that to "those kids" and that he does not like "sad stories". He later appears alongside Aizen and Tosen in Karakura Town, commenting on Kira's sudden change in emotion to Tōsen and remarks that he is glad Kira is 'doing well'. After the arrival of the Vizards, Gin mortally wounds Hiyori Sarugaki when she gave into one of Aizen's taunts and battles Ichigo while Aizen deals with the remaining opposition. Easily overpowering Ichigo, Gin gives him several attempts to run while mocking his inability to defeat Aizen before accompanying his leader to the real Karakura Town.

In Karakura town, Gin is confronted briefly by Rangiku over his motives before immobilizing her to make it appeared that  he killed her when by the time he returns to Aizen's side. After Aizen explains his intent to kill Ichigo's human friends before destroying Karakura town, faking his intent to do the deal for him, Gin uses that moment  to restrain his master's Zanpakutō and pierces him with his own. Though Aizen expected it, Gin reveals his Bankai's true power and uses the blade shard he left in Aizen's body to dissolve most of Aizen's body. Taking the Hogyōku, Gin believed he succeeded until Aizen revives in new form, stating that the Hogyōku is his regardless if it is inside of him or not. Aizen then grievously injures Gin in front of Ichigo's friends as an awakened Rangiku rushes by his side, Gin silently apologizes for being unable to return what Aizen had taken from Rangiku as a child. When Ichigo arrives, a relieved Gin dies seeing the youth to have become strong enough to defeat their mutual enemy.

Abilities

It takes the form of a wakizashi when sealed. The guard is shaped like an 'S'. Shinsō's shikai is triggered by the phrase ; in the anime, this was slightly changed to the declarative ikorosu. In the English translation of the series, the phrase is inconsistent between uses, but mostly describes stabbing (slay, impale, pierce). Another trigger phrase, used in the first Soul Society arc, was "Shoot 'em dead". Its first rendering in the Viz translation was "skewer that punk".

In its shikai, Shinsō's blade glows white and extends up to the length of one hundred sword blades and at high speed to impale Gin's opponents. In addition to making it a deadly long-range weapon, the extending blade also carries tremendous force without affecting Gin, making it useful for dislodging heavy objects, as seen when Gin pushes both Ichigo Kurosaki and the giant Jidanbō out from under the Seireitei gate, despite Jidanbō being firmly braced under it. Once extended, Gin can maintain the blade's length and swing Shinsō in wide arcs, simultaneously attacking multiple targets with speed and ease.

In his rematch with Ichigo he reveals his bankai, . While in bankai, Gin originally said that his blade can extend to up to 13 kilometers or 8.07 miles, making him capable of bisecting a whole block of large buildings with a single swing while far away. The speed at which the sword extends and contracts is originally said to be 500 times the speed of sound (171,500 meters per second), reaching its full length in less than 1/10 of a second, making it the fastest zanpakutō. Gin would downplay the speed of his sword, by instead bragging to his opponent about the length and cutting force, in order to gain a psychological advantage. His bankai'''s technique  uses his zanpakutōs speed and length properties to an amazing extent. By holding his zanpakutō to his chest with both hands, the blade extends and contracts at blinding speeds. A form of this technique  is the same technique as Buto, but repeats the action in rapid succession many times over, appearing as a wave of blades attacking the opponent. The blade's extension and contraction speed makes the technique so fast, that the individual movements involved are unseen by the opponent, leaving little time for evasion.

When Gin turns on Aizen, he reveals that he lied about his bankai's length and speed, and that its true power is that it turns into dust for a split moment of the extension/retraction, in which would allow it to release a deadly poison that rests within the interior of the blade into whomever or whatever Gin stabs. Upon the command, the poison activates, dissolving the victim at a cellular level from the inside-out. Gin hid this ability from Aizen for decades, intending to use it to kill the latter after learning the weakness of his zanpakutō.

Before it was revealed in the actual series, various Bleach console games have depicted Shinsō as having additional abilities. In Bleach: Blade Battlers Gin shoots Shinsō into the ground and the blade hits the opponent from underneath, whereas in Bleach: Heat the Soul 5, a wave of blades instead shoots up from the ground to hit the opponent.

Reception
Although only heard in two episodes, Gin's "bye bye" has been very popular with audiences.

In both the 2nd and 3rd popularity polls, Ichimaru placed 5th. However, like Renji Abarai, he missed the top 10 of the most recent poll, being replaced with newer characters like Grimmjow Jeagerjaques and Ulquiorra Cifer. Gin was among the 4 Bleach characters to make the top 100 list in Newtype Japan's 2007 list of the most popular anime characters. Tite Kubo remarked in a 2004 Shōnen Jump character commentary that Gin's popularity, especially among women, was a great surprise to him, as he had attempted to make Gin creepy and offputting in appearance.

Critics seem to take note of Gin's "interesting design;" IGN says he "has always been a rather odd character with his squinty eyes and cheesy smile" and adds "...he can swing a Zanpakutō like it is nobody's business as well, but it is his smile that gets us more than anything else...". Another IGN review of Bleach volume 17 used Gin as an example of Bleach'''s colorful and well-developed supporting cast, and remarked that his story would be capable of filling a manga series of its own.

References

Anime and manga characters who use magic
Bleach characters
Comics characters introduced in 2003
Fictional amputees
Fictional characters from Kansai
Fictional commanders
Fictional kenjutsuka
Fictional military captains
Fictional military lieutenants
Fictional murderers
Fictional swordfighters in anime and manga
Male characters in anime and manga